Lisa Robertson (born 13 October 1961) is a Canadian rower. She competed in the women's eight event at the 1984 Summer Olympics.

References

External links
 

1961 births
Living people
Canadian female rowers
Olympic rowers of Canada
Rowers at the 1984 Summer Olympics
Rowers from Victoria, British Columbia
Commonwealth Games medallists in rowing
Commonwealth Games silver medallists for Canada
Rowers at the 1986 Commonwealth Games
20th-century Canadian women
Medallists at the 1986 Commonwealth Games